Nemapogon vartianae is a moth of the family Tineidae. It is found in Syria and Turkey.

References

Moths described in 1986
Nemapogoninae